Hwang Sung-min (born 23 June 1991) is a South Korean footballer who plays as a goalkeeper for FC Seoul in the K League 1.

Club career
He was selected by Chungju Hummel in 2013 K League draft. He made his debut match in the opening game of the 2013 season.

He joined FC Seoul of K League 1 for the 2022 season.

References

External links 

1991 births
Living people
Hannam University alumni
South Korean footballers
Association football goalkeepers
Chungju Hummel FC players
Ulsan Hyundai Mipo Dockyard FC players
Ansan Greeners FC players
Jeju United FC players
Gyeongnam FC players
FC Seoul players
Korea National League players
K League 2 players
K League 1 players